Kamimachi (written: 上町) may refer to:

 (born 1981), Japanese handball player
, train station in Segataya, Tokyo, Japan

Japanese-language surnames